Stara Huta-Koszary  is a village in the administrative district of Gmina Bieliny, within Kielce County, Świętokrzyskie Voivodeship, in south-central Poland.

The village has a population of 220.

References

Stara Huta-Koszary